Jean-Baptiste Monge (born June 11, 1971 in Nantes) is a French fantasy author and illustrator. He lives presently in Canada, in a small town, north of Montreal.

Biography

Jean-Baptiste Monge issued his first illustrated book Halloween in 1996, in collaboration with Erlé Ferronnière with whom he worked for 10 years; the book has been published by Avis de tempête, further renamed Au Bord des Continents.

In 2004, Jean-Baptiste Monge and Erlé Ferronnière agreed to end their collaboration, each willing to go it alone.

In 2006, he issued his first solo book, Carnet de croquis, archives de Féerie Tome I, illustration, texts and layout.

In October 2007, he attended FaeriCon ‘07 in Philadelphia (USA) in order to get contacts for the publication in the United States of  A la recherche de Féerie Tomes I and II, Carnet de croquis as well as Celtic Faeries.

In 2007 and 2008, he worked for the collective books L'Univers des Dragons published by Galerie Daniel Maghen.

In October 2008, during the Utopiales, 9th edition of the International Science-Fiction Festival (Nantes 2008-10-29 to 2008-11-02), he received the Wojtek Siudmak Award 2008 for the cover illustration of Comptines assassines, Pierre Dubois's book published by Hoebeke.

The jury of Spectrum 16 (Kansas City 2009-03-02) has given special recognition for superior achievement to artists in each of eight categories. Silver Award for Book Illustration has been given to Jean-Baptiste Monge. The jury consisted of Kevin Brimmer [artist/art director Muller Bressler Brown], David Dorman [artist], Donato Giancola [artist/instructor School of Visual Arts], Steven Sanders [artist], and Robert Self [publisher: Baby Tattoo Books].

He was presented the Art&fact Award 2009 for his entire work by James Gurney (Dinotopia) during the Utopiales, 10th edition of the International Science-Fiction Festival (Nantes 2009-10-28 to 2009-11-01).

The jury of Spectrum 19 (Kansas City 2009-05-19) has given to Jean-Baptiste Monge the Silver Award for Book Illustration and the Golden Award for Editorial. The jury consisted of Peter de Sève [artist], Jeremy Cranford [Sr. Art Manager/Blizzard Entertainment], Dawn Rivera-Ernster [Director: Talent Development & Recruitment Walt Disney Animation Studios], Scott Gustafson [artist], and Jon Schindehette [Senior Creative Director Wizards of the Coast].

Monge has his own publishing company, Goblin's WAY.

Illustration works
 Halloween (1997), with Erlé Ferronnière.
 Baltimore & Redingote (1999), with Pascal Moguérou (texts).
 À la Recherche de Féerie tome I (2002), with Erlé Ferronnière.
 À la Recherche de Féerie tome II (2004), with Erlé Ferronnière.
 Carnet de croquis, archives de Féerie Tome I (2006).
 Celtic Faeries (2007), prefaced by Pierre Dubois.
 L'Univers des Dragons, Premiers Feux (2007), collective work, contribution for texts and illustrations.
 Carnet de croquis, archives de Féerie Tome II (2008), new images of Féerie along with unpublished works on Heroic Fantasy.
 Best of Faeries (2008), portfolio including 15 images (format 30x40cm) ready for framing (5 never before published), selected among his best illustrations.
 L'Univers des Dragons, Deuxième souffle (2008), collective work, contribution for illustrations.

Awards
 Wojtek Siudmak Award 2008 (UTOPIALES 09).
 Silver Award 2009 (SPECTRUM 16), for book illustration : Dunlee Darnan (front cover of ‘’Celtic Faeries").
 Art&Fact Award 2009 (UTOPIALES 10).
 Silver Award 2012 (SPECTRUM 19), for book illustration : Ragnarok (published in l'Univers des Dragons, Premiers Feux).
 Golden Award 2012 (SPECTRUM 19), for editorial : Mic Mac Cormac(published in Best of Faeries).

References

External links
 Official Site Jean-Baptiste Monge 
 Spectrum Fantastic Art
 Au Bord des Continents
 Galerie Daniel Maghen
 Utopiales 2009

Fantasy artists
French illustrators
French children's book illustrators
French speculative fiction artists
20th-century illustrators of fairy tales
21st-century illustrators of fairy tales
Living people
1971 births